The R69 is a provincial route in KwaZulu-Natal, South Africa that connects Vryheid with Mkuze via Louwsburg.

References

External links
 Routes Travel Info

69
Provincial routes in South Africa